Chitungwiza is an urban centre and town of Harare Province in Zimbabwe.

History 

As of the 2022 census, Chitungwiza had a population of 371,244.

There are two main highways which connect the city to Harare namely Seke road and Chitungwiza road.

The Chitungwiza Aquatic Complex, built in 1995 for the All Africa Games, is no longer functional, and serves as a music and church venue.

Informal settlements 

Following the civil war, people moved to urban areas. Chitungwiza grew rapidly and the squatted area of Chirambahuyo alone had a population of 30,000 in 1979. Chirambahuyo was demolished by the authorities in 1982 and the inhabitants squatted elsewhere in the city in areas such as Mayambara.

Areas in Chitungwiza were destroyed by Operation Murambatsvina in 2005. By the mid-2010s, the number of people squatting in informal settlements was growing. In 2020, the local authorities abandoned their plans to demolish squatter homes in Nyatsime, Seke, St Mary’s and Zengeza, after a court order was requested.

Notable people 

The musician Maskiri comes from Chitungwiza.

The Town Clerk in 2016 was Dr George Makunde, who complained that a reduction in his wage from $10,000 per month to $4,500 per month had put him in difficulties. In 2019 and 2020, Dr. Tonderai Kasu served as the Acting Town Clerk. Emmanuel Makandiwa and Alick Macheso are from Chitungwiza.

Current Mayor: Lovemore Maiko

References

 
Populated places in Harare Province
Populated places established in 1978
1978 establishments in Africa
Squats
Squatting in Zimbabwe